Paul Satinder "Bubli" Chohan (born 2 July 1957 in Ludhiana, Punjab, India) is an Indian-born Canadian former field hockey player who represented Canada.

International senior competitions
 1975 – Pan American Games, Mexico (2nd)
 1976 – Olympic Games, Montreal (10th)
 1978 – World Cup, Buenos Aires (11th)
 1979 – Pan American Games, San Juan (2nd)
 1981 – World Cup Qualifier, Kuala Lumpur (9th)
 1983 – Pan American Games, Caracas (1st)
 1984 – Olympic Games, Los Angeles (10th)
 1985 – World Cup Qualifier, Barcelona (4th)
 1986 – World Cup, London (10th)
 1987 – Pan American Games, Indianapolis (1st)
 1988 – Olympic Games, Seoul (11th)
 1989 – World Cup Qualifier, Madison, USA (2nd)
 1990 – World Cup, Lahore (11th)
 1991 – Pan American Games, Havana (2nd)
 1995 – Pan American Games, Mar del Plata (2nd)
 1996 – Olympic Qualifier, Barcelona (6th)
 1996 – World Cup Preliminary, Sardinia (2nd)
 1997 – World Cup Qualifier, Kuala Lumpur (5th)

References

External links
 
 
 
 
 

1957 births
Living people
Canadian field hockey coaches
Canadian male field hockey players
Olympic field hockey players of Canada
Field hockey players at the 1976 Summer Olympics
Field hockey players at the 1984 Summer Olympics
Field hockey players at the 1988 Summer Olympics
Pan American Games gold medalists for Canada
Pan American Games silver medalists for Canada
Field hockey players at the 1975 Pan American Games
Field hockey players at the 1979 Pan American Games
Field hockey players at the 1983 Pan American Games
Field hockey players at the 1987 Pan American Games
Field hockey players at the 1991 Pan American Games
Field hockey players from Vancouver
Sportspeople from Ludhiana
Field hockey players from Punjab, India
Indian emigrants to Canada
Canadian people of Punjabi descent
Canadian sportspeople of Indian descent
Naturalized citizens of Canada
Pan American Games medalists in field hockey
1978 Men's Hockey World Cup players
Medalists at the 1975 Pan American Games
Medalists at the 1979 Pan American Games
Medalists at the 1983 Pan American Games
Medalists at the 1987 Pan American Games
Medalists at the 1991 Pan American Games